Michigan's 2nd Senate district is one of 38 districts in the Michigan Senate. It has been represented by Democrat Sylvia Santana since 2023, succeeding fellow Democrat Adam Hollier.

Geography
District 2 encompasses part of Wayne County.

2011 Apportionment Plan
District 2, as dictated by the 2011 Apportionment Plan, was based in northern Detroit in Wayne County, also covering the nearby communities of Highland Park, Hamtramck, Harper Woods, Grosse Pointe Woods, Grosse Pointe Shores, Grosse Pointe Farms, Grosse Pointe, and Grosse Pointe Park. It shared a water border with Canada along Lake St. Clair.

The district overlapped with Michigan's 13th and 14th congressional districts, and with the 1st, 2nd, 3rd, 4th, 5th, 6th, and 7th districts of the Michigan House of Representatives.

Recent election results

2018
Following incumbent Bert Johnson's resignation, a special election and a regular election were held concurrently in 2018; in the special election, Adam Hollier won the primary against a similar slate of candidates and won the general election uncontested.

2014

Federal and statewide results in District 2

Historical district boundaries

References 

2
Wayne County, Michigan